In mathematics, the word constant conveys multiple meanings. As an adjective, it refers to non-variance (i.e. unchanging with respect to some other value); as a noun, it has two different meanings: 
 A fixed and well-defined number or other non-changing mathematical object. The terms mathematical constant or physical constant are sometimes used to distinguish this meaning.
 A function whose value remains unchanged (i.e., a constant function). Such a constant is commonly represented by a variable which does not depend on the main variable(s) in question. 

For example, a general quadratic function is commonly written as:

A more explicit way to denote this function is

More generally, any polynomial term or expression of degree zero (no variable) is a constant.

Constant function 

A constant may be used to define a constant function that ignores its arguments and always gives the same value. Such a function always takes the same value (in this case 5), because the variable does not appear in the expression defining the function.

Context-dependence 

The context-dependent nature of the concept of "constant" can be seen in this example from elementary calculus:

"Constant" means not depending on some variable; not changing as that variable changes. In the first case above, it means not depending on h; in the second, it means not depending on x. A constant in a narrower context could be regarded as a variable in a broader context.

Notable mathematical constants

Some values occur frequently in mathematics and are conventionally denoted by a specific symbol. These standard symbols and their values are called mathematical constants. Examples include:
 0 (zero).
 1 (one), the natural number after zero.
  (pi), the constant representing the ratio of a circle's circumference to its diameter, approximately equal to 3.141592653589793238462643.
 , approximately equal to 2.718281828459045235360287.
 , the imaginary unit such that .
  (square root of 2), the length of the diagonal of a square with unit sides, approximately equal to 1.414213562373095048801688.
  (golden ratio), approximately equal to 1.618033988749894848204586, or algebraically, .

Constants in calculus
In calculus, constants are treated in several different ways depending on the operation. For example, the derivative (rate of change) of a constant function is zero. This is because constants, by definition, do not change. Their derivative is hence zero.

Conversely, when integrating a constant function, the constant is multiplied by the variable of integration.

During the evaluation of a limit, a constant remains the same as it was before and after evaluation.

Integration of a function of one variable often involves a constant of integration. This arises due to the fact that the integral is the inverse (opposite) of the derivative meaning that the aim of integration is to recover the original function before differentiation. The derivative of a constant function is zero, as noted above, and the differential operator is a linear operator, so functions that only differ by a constant term have the same derivative. To acknowledge this, a constant of integration is added to an indefinite integral; this ensures that all possible solutions are included. The constant of integration is generally written as 'c', and represents a constant with a fixed but undefined value.

Examples
If  is the constant function such that  for every  then

See also
Constant (disambiguation)
Expression
Level set
List of mathematical constants
Physical constant

References

External links

Algebra
Elementary mathematics